Folkfuck folie ("Folkfuck Folly") is the second album by French black metal band Peste Noire. A limited vinyl version co-produced by Northern Heritage and De profundis éditions was released in April 2010. It includes a long 2007 interview answered by Famine.

Track listing

Credits
La Sale Famine de Valfunde – all guitars, vocals
Indria – bass
Winterhalter – drums
Neige – guitar, vocals on "La Césarienne"
La sale Famine de Valfunde – artwork and concept

References

Peste Noire albums
2007 albums